Oxegen 2013 was the ninth Oxegen festival to take place since 2004. It took place on the weekend of Friday 2 August, Saturday, 3 August and Sunday, 4 August at Punchestown Racecourse near Naas in County Kildare, Ireland.

It was confirmed on the official Oxegen website in April 2013 that the festival would return to the Irish festival line-up this summer, after a one-year hiatus in 2012.

On 22 April an announcement was made to confirm the first set of acts playing. Confirmed were Calvin Harris, Rizzle Kicks, Jack Beats, Duke Dumont, Example, Pitbull, Nero. On 24 April David Guetta was announced as one of the headline acts along with Example and Snoop Dogg.

There was rain on the Saturday with around 25,000 fans present and more than 600 gardai and 1,000 stewards patrolling the site.

Line Up
Earliest performer listed first in each list.

Friday 2 August
The following artists played on the Red Bull Electric ballroom stage
 Eli & Fur - 20:00 Start
 Fake Blood - 21:00 Start
 Sasha - 22:00 Start
 Otto Knows - 23:00 Start
 Alesso - 00:00 Start

Saturday 3 August
The following artists played on the Heineken Live Project main stage
Gin N Juice - 13:30 Start
Iggy Azalea - Cancelled set due to illness
The Original Rudeboys
 DJ Vincent Stuart
Naughty Boy
DJ Fresh
Rita Ora
Labrinth
Example
Calvin Harris - 00:00 Start

The following artists played on the Red Bull Electric ballroom stage
 Jamie Byrne - 13:30 Start
 Jordan Kaye
 Hix
 Paul Webb
 Rory Lynam
 Jacob Plant
 Dead Prezidents
 Erol Alkan
 Nero
 2manydjs - 00:00 Start

The following artists played on the Other stage
 Reuben Keeney - 13:30 Start
 Dec Byrne
 David McGoff
 Mulljoy
 Yunisun
 Simon Says
 Dave Devalera
 Congorock - 20:30 Start

Sunday 4 August
The following artists played on the Heineken Live Project main Stage
 Monsta - 13:30 Start
Devlin
Wretch 32
DJ Tommy Truffles
Rizzle Kicks
Pitbull
Snoop Dogg
Chase & Status
David Guetta - 23:40 Start

The following artists played on the Red Bull Electric ballroom stage
 The Hijackers - 13:30 Start
 Dashka & Remik
 Rhythm Scene
 Fred & Darragh Flynn
 Al Gibbs
 John Gibbons
 Borgore
 Crookers
 Duke Dumont
 Dimitri Vegas & Like Mike
 Nicky Romero - 00:00 Start

The following artists played on the Other stage
 G Frequency - 14:30 Start
 Mr. Devitt
 Razor
 Cause & Effect
 Ayah Marrar
 Jack Beats
 Danny Byrd - 20:40 Start

See also
List of electronic music festivals
Live electronic music

References

External links
 Official website

13
2013 in Irish music
2013 music festivals